Eulepidotis inclyta is a moth of the family Erebidae first described by Johan Christian Fabricius in 1775. It is found in the Neotropical realm, including Ecuador, Brazil and Honduras.

References

Moths described in 1775
inclyta
Taxa named by Johan Christian Fabricius